Edward Chessall Scobell (27 January 1850 – 8 February 1917) was an Anglican priest who served as Archdeacon of Gloucester from 1903 until his death.

He was born into an ecclesiastical family, son of Sanford George Scobell, vicar of Market Rasen. Educated at Marlborough College, he attended Pembroke College, Oxford and was ordained in 1874. After curacies in Horsham and Gloucester he was a Lecturer at Gloucester Theological College from 1877 to 1881. After this he was Vicar of St Luke's, Gloucester (1881–89); Examining Chaplain to the Bishops of Gloucester (1883–1917); Rector of Upton St Leonards (1889–1912); Rural Dean of Gloucester (1890–1903); and Residentiary Canon of Gloucester Cathedral (1912–1917).

References

1850 births
People educated at Marlborough College
Alumni of Pembroke College, Oxford
Archdeacons of Gloucester
1917 deaths